Through the Shadows (Italian: La madre folle) is a 1923 Italian silent film directed by Carmine Gallone.

Cast
 Yvonne Fleuriel 
 Frisco 
 Mario Fumagalli 
 Soava Gallone 
 Arnold Kent 
 Nella Montagna 
 Giuseppe Pierozzi 
 Fosco Risturi 
 Raimondo Van Riel

References

Bibliography
 Ken Wlaschin. The Silent Cinema in Song, 1896-1929: An Illustrated History and Catalog of Songs Inspired by the Movies and Stars, with a List of Recordings. McFarland & Company, 2009.

External links

1923 films
1920s Italian-language films
Films directed by Carmine Gallone
Italian silent feature films
Italian black-and-white films